Lutibacter citreus is a Gram-negative, aerobic, rod-shaped and non-motile bacterium from the genus of Lutibacter which has been isolated from surface sediments from the Arctic.

References

Flavobacteria
Bacteria described in 2020